This article describes the role of women in the society of the Muisca. The Muisca are the original inhabitants of the Altiplano Cundiboyacense (present-day central Colombian Andes) before the Spanish conquest of the Muisca in the first half of the 16th century. Their society was one of the four great civilizations of the Americas.

Women were important and considered egalitarian to men in most cases in the Muisca society. While the men were tasked with hunting, warfare, and other activities, the women performed the sowing of the farmfields, the preparation of foods and chicha and the education of children. The participation in the religious rituals was of both genders. The most important deities of the Muisca were female; Chía as goddess of the Moon, Huitaca of sexual liberation and Bachué the mother goddess of the Muisca people.

While the first chroniclers were all male, during the period of conquest and early colonisation Gonzalo Jiménez de Quesada, Pedro Simón, Juan de Castellanos and Lucas Fernández de Piedrahita, 20th and 21st century anthropology has been conducted by many women scientists. Main contributors to the knowledge of women in the Muisca society have been Muisca scholars Ana María Groot, Marianne Cardale de Schrimpff, Sylvia Broadbent, Ana María Gómez Londoño, Martha Herrera Ángel and various others.

Background 
Following the largely preceramic Herrera Period, the Muisca people lived in the valleys and higher altitude terrains of the Altiplano Cundiboyacense, in the Eastern Ranges of the Colombian Andes. Estimates of the size of the community vary from 300,000 to two million people at the time of the Spanish conquest as of 1537. The Muisca were predominantly farmers and merchants, with a loose political organisation in their Muisca Confederation. Agriculture was performed on simple terraces on the slopes of the mountains and on the high plains of the Altiplano, especially the Bogotá savanna. Their principal agricultural products cultivated were maize, potatoes, arracacha, tubers, beans, yuca, pumpkins, gourds, tomatoes, peppers, cotton, pineapples, avocadoes, tobacco, quinoa and coca.

Famous is their well-elaborated Muisca art, especially their goldworking. Different from the other three well-known civilisations of the Americas; the Maya, Aztec and Inca, they did not construct grand architecture.

Muisca words for women 

Women in Muisca society 
In the pre-Columbian societies, the women formed a central part in the explanation of the world, the structuring of the family and community, the religious life, in the labour of the farmfields, mythology, arts, and in all aspects of the organisation of society. In these communities, the woman was the centre of the birth of the culture. The fertility of the women played a central role in the rich agriculture of the Muisca. Women were raised for the labour of sowing and harvest, preparation of food, textile work, ceramics and in the sacred ceremonies.

The women in the Muisca civilisation, especially under the Code of Nemequene, had special rights over their husbands, mainly the caciques. The Code consisted of a system of penalties of horrific practice, but was focused on the stability of the society, especially in cases of adultery, cheating, incest and rape. It was the Muisca men forbidden to leave their wives and if she died doing labour the spouse was ordered to pay off her family. Infidelity of the women was punished by forcing her to have sex with the ten ugliest men of the tribe. They also were condemned to fasting.

The wives of the leaders of the community wore skirts until their ankles, while common women had skirts up to their knees. Maids, or sometimes called concubines, were called tegui.

The majority of the pre-Columbian cultures which had female leaders and egalitarian conditions between man and woman, went through a process of transformation towards a male leadership through the defense of their territories.

A census held in 1780 in the capital of the Viceroyalty of New Granada, Bogotá, resulted in a 63.5% of women in the city. The women from indigenous origin moved to the capital for two reasons; to work in the households of the Spanish colonisers and to look for husbands, as the mestizo status provided them with more security.

Matrilineal heritage of rule 
The Muisca woman were very important in the organisation of the family and for the Muisca rulers. The children pertained to the mother and in case of heritage were assigned to the mother, not the father. The new zipa and zaque was traditionally chosen from the eldest sons of the elder sister of the previous ruler and the woman had the liberty to live together for a while to make sure the relation worked and they were fertile. After marriage total fidelity was guaranteed.

Exceptions to the tradition of the matrilineal heritage of rule were present in the later stages of the Muisca civilisation. Around the time of the arrival of the Spanish conquistadores, the rule of Tisquesusa was followed by his brother, Sagipa.

Women's roles in the Muisca society 
The Muisca women were considered important in transferring their fertility to the farmlands, which meant they were the ones to sow the fields, while the men went hunting, fishing and went to war with neighbouring groups, such as the Panche. The women also prepared and sold the alcoholic beverage of the Muisca, chicha. To prepare the chicha and aid in the fermentation process, the women chewed on the maize kernels. During rituals, which could last for fifteen days, the women sang. The Muisca laws protected the women from physical attacks and made sure the pregnant women received a special treatment. This treatment continued to the first years of motherhood and in the case of widowhood. The food of the Muisca, eaten while sitting on the ground of their bohíos, was prepared uniquely by the Muisca women.

Women also played an important role in the extraction of salt. The Muisca, known as "The Salt People" due to their salt mines in Zipaquirá, Nemocón and Tausa, extracted salt by evaporating brines in large pots. They used the salt in their cuisine, for the preparation of dried fish and meat and as product in their economy.

Polygamy, polyamory and sexual rites 
The Muisca, as many other pre-Columbian cultures, practiced polygamy. The narrations of the amount of wives vary, but it was common for the higher caste caciques to have twenty (gueta) wives. Some sources even account for one hundred spouses. Less reliable sources, such as Vicente Restrepo in the 19th century, call for a number of up to 300 wives. The many wives allowed the most prominent of the Muisca rulers to elaborate larger farmlands than lower castes. When the principal wife of the cacique, zaque or zipa died, the male ruler was obliged to abstain from sexual relations for five years.

Virginity was not highly regarded in the Muisca society; women who were virgins were considered the ugliest. An exception were the virgins captured from neighbouring indigenous groups (Panche, Muzo, Lache, Guayupe, Guane, Chitarero), who were used in ceremonies as sacrifices.

In general, the practices of polygamy, the period of cohabitation before marriage, the unimportance of virginity and the resulting sexual promiscuity were very different in pre-Columbian Colombia from the later Spanish colonial norms and laws.

Religion and mythology 
In the Muisca religion, as with other pre-Columbian religions in the Americas, various deities were female and they were among the most important. The inhabitation of the Earth is explained by the mother goddess Bachué, who is said to have been born in Lake Iguaque in current Boyacá. One of the major deities in the religion of the Muisca was Chía, the goddess of the Moon. She was worshipped throughout the Muisca Confederation, but especially in her Moon Temple in the city named after her; Chía, Cundinamarca. Chía was symbolic for the placental life, the games and the dances. The rituals at the temples of the Muisca were mixed; men and women together.

The Moon Temple not only formed a place of worship, also education to the new caciques and Muisca rulers was given near the temple.

Huitaca was the rebelling goddess of arts, dance and music, witchcraft and sexual liberation of the Muisca. She is sometimes equated with Chía, but mostly considered a separate deity. In the Muisca religion, it was Huitaca who caused the Funza River to overflow, forcing the Muisca to inhabit higher terrains on the Bogotá savanna.

Cuchavira, the god of the rainbow, guarded the women during their work on the farmfields, in their Chibcha language called tá, as is visible in many toponyms of the area in modern times; Bogotá, Chivatá, Cucaita, Guayatá, Machetá and Tota, among many others.

According to chronicler Bernardo de Sahagún, new-born girls were sometimes offered to the Muisca gods. This practice was accepted by the Muisca people as they viewed their gods as part of their community and ensured fertility of their lands.

Lake Guatavita 
A story in the Muisca mythology about the wife of the cacique of Guatavita tells about her disloyalty to her husband. As punishment for this act, the people tortured her lover, a guecha warrior, by cutting off his private parts and eating them in a ceremonial ritual. The wife of the cacique jumped into the lake with her son and drowned. The cacique mourning the deaths, ordered to retrieve the bodies from the lake.

This history formed the basis for the sacred Lake Guatavita and the later legend of El Dorado, as narrated by early Spanish chronicler Pedro Simón.

Famous Muisca women 
Magdalena of Guatavita
Noncetá
Usaca
Zoratama

Notable female Muisca scientists 
Soledad Acosta Samper, Ana María Groot de Mahecha, Marianne Cardale de Schrimpff, Sylvia M. Broadbent, Margarita Silva Montaña, others

See also 

Wife selling (English custom)
Gender roles among the indigenous peoples of North America, women in the Catholic Church
Gender roles in Mesoamerica
Women in Maya society

References

Bibliography

External links 
  Animated video about the Muisca goddesses

Muisca
 
History of women in Colombia